Les Petites Notes is a 1993 album by French singer Liane Foly, and her break-out album. After selling 400,000 copies in less than a year in France the album was adapted by Tim Rice and Peter Kingsbury and re-engineered for international release in 25 markets by Sade's producer Mike Pela under the English title "Sweet Mystery.

Singles
The 1993 single from the album, the song "Doucement", was composed by Foly with André Manoukian and Lorenz Viennet. This was initially recorded with Jean-Marc Benaïs, Gilles Coquard, Pierre Drevet, Liane Foly, Carole Fredericks and Richard Galliano, and re-recorded for the 1999 Acoustique album with Theos Allen, Philippe Falliex, Hervé Gourdikian, Eric Legnini, Nick Moroch and Mike Robinson.

Track list

Les Petites Notes (1993)
Les Faux Soleils
Doucement
Voler la Nuit
Les Parfums d'Autrefois
Laisse Pleurer Les Nuages
Une Larme de Bonheur
La Marelle
J'Irai Tranquille
Passe le Temps
Les Yeux Doux
Les Petites Notes

Sweet Mystery (1995)
A trace of you (doucement)
Sweet mystery
When you smile
Les parfums d'autrefois
Voler la nuit
Tell me why
Tear of desire
No sweat
Who knows why
Anywhere anyplace anytime
Au fur et à mesure
Les petites notes

References

1993 albums